

Olympic Games

World Championships
The World Road Championships was held in Limburg, Netherlands.

Grand Tours

UCI World Tour

2.HC Category Races

1.HC Category Races

UCI tours

Continental Championships

African Cycling Championships

Asian Cycling Championships

U23 European Championships

Oceania Cycling Championships

National Championships

References

See also
2012 in women's road cycling

 
Men's road cycling by year